The 2022 Wellington City mayoral election, part of the Wellington local elections in October 2022, determined who would serve as Mayor of the City of Wellington for the next three-year term. It was won by Tory Whanau, a former Green Party parliamentary chief of staff. 

The election used the single transferable vote (STV) system. Whanau's win in the seventh iteration over eight opponents, who included incumbent mayor Andy Foster and Rongotai MP Paul Eagle, was described as a landslide victory. The turnout of 45% was an increase from previous elections.

Background and electoral method
Andy Foster was first elected to Wellington City Council in the 1992 elections, and served continuously until he was elected mayor in the 2019 election. Despite Foster's centre-right position, a majority centre-left council was elected in the 2019 local elections. Infighting amongst the council was reported in February 2021 after Fleur Fitzsimons reported Foster to the Auditor-General over his proposal to privatise the city's main library, and cited decision-making and governance inconsistent with the Local Government Act 2002. Shortly afterwards, Foster announced an independent review of the council's governance. The review found issues with the council including with its governance structure, direction and oversight, that some council staff felt unsafe in giving free and frank advice.

The mayor is elected at large using the single transferable vote system. Under the Local Government Act 2002, candidates were allowed to spend up to $60,000 on the campaign.

Candidates 
Nine candidates were nominated for the mayoralty.

Declined to be candidates
Diane Calvert, city councillor
Jenny Condie, city councillor
Jill Day, city councillor
Fleur Fitzsimons, city councillor
Laurie Foon, city councillor
Sarah Free, deputy mayor
Nick Leggett, former mayor of Porirua
Justin Lester, former mayor
Iona Pannett, city councillor
Tamatha Paul, city councillor
Simon Woolf, city councillor
Nicola Young, city councillor

Campaign

Paul Eagle
Eagle announced his campaign and his endorsement by the Labour Party on 26 June 2022. Eagle ran on a "back to basics" platform, focusing on repairing city infrastructure. He took leave as an MP from 8 July to campaign, and donated to charity his salary for that period. Eagle spent $57,733 on his campaign.

Andy Foster
Foster announced his intention to seek re-election on 7 July 2022 on Newstalk ZB. He spent $54,108, including $17,000 on billboards.

Tory Whanau
Whanau announced her entry into the race on 18 November 2021, and was endorsed by the Green Party in April 2022. She formally launched her campaign on 30 June 2022. Georgina Campbell of The New Zealand Herald wrote that Whanau's early announcement helped her to overcome low name recognition. Whanau utilised street-level posters around the city to advertise. Whanau spent $59,844, which included $23,000 on street-level posters and $15,000 on digital billboards.

Issues and positions
In May 2022, The Dominion Post reporter Tom Hunt identified the top election issues as public safety, commercial vibrancy, housing affordability, transport, rates, water infrastructure, climate change and council culture. The council indicated in its pre-election report that the biggest issues facing the city are infrastructure and planning for growth, resilience and adaptability, the economy, funding and resourcing and the changing local government sector. A poll of voters by Q+A and Kantar found that water infrastructure was the top issue, followed by climate change adaptation, road maintenance, reducing rates, and public transport investment.

On 18 August, The Dominion Post reported mayoral and council candidate Barbara McKenzie as being an anti-vaxxer, not denying forming part of Voices for Freedom, and avowing support for 6 January U.S. Capitol rioters.

Transport
Let's Get Wellington Moving, a programme of infrastructure works proposed by a consortium of Wellington City Council, Greater Wellington Regional Council and Waka Kotahi, includes a proposed light rail line from the city centre to Island Bay and a second tunnel through Mount Victoria. Eagle, Foster and Whanau all expressed support for the project, however Eagle and Whanau called for a review of the 60:40 funding split between central and local government. Chung stated a preference for bus rapid transit over light rail, and Dudfield stood for a significant modification of the proposal to focus on road traffic.

Whanau supported the completion of the Paneke Pōneke cycleway network, while Eagle opposed it and Foster called for a refocus of how it is being delivered.

Whanau campaigned for extending the pedestrian zone of Cuba Street and trialling the use of Low Traffic Neighbourhoods in suburban areas.

Water infrastructure
The Sixth Labour Government of New Zealand is proposing a Three Waters reform programme to centralise water management infrastructure between territorial authorities. Foster cautiously opposed the reforms "as they stand", supporting co-governance but favouring a review into local government and amendments to the Resource Management Act. Eagle and Whanau supported the reform programme.

Debates

Opinion polling

Results

Aftermath
Whanau's win saw her become the first Māori mayor of Wellington, and the first person since Mark Blumsky in 1995 to be elected mayor of Wellington without experience as a city councillor. Her win was described as a landslide victory, and the most decisive since Wellington began using STV in 2004. Eagle's third-place finish was described as an upset.

The 2022 mayoral elections generally saw a swing to the political right, with Whanau's win an exception to that trend. Both of the highest-polling candidates supported expansion of cycleways and mass transit. All candidates agreed on further investment in 'pipes' to improve water infrastructure. Voters preferred candidates whose position on Three Waters reform was of mild opposition (Foster) or supportive. Strong opponents of the reform such as Dudfield polled relatively poorly.   

Whanau credited her campaign's success to its mobilisation of voters, and commentators described the election result as a vote for change, and consistent with a desire to 'fix what was going wrong' in water, transport, and housing. Lara Greaves from the University of Auckland stated that Whanau's early declaration of her intention to run for mayor helped to increase her visibility. Eagle conceded that his centrist campaign was the wrong strategy.

References

Mayoral elections in Wellington
2022 elections in New Zealand